(When the Lord turned [the captivity of Zion]), sometimes referred to as , is the Latin version of Psalm 126 (thus numbered in the King James Bible, number 125 in the Latin psalters). It has been set in full for a cappella choir by, amongst others, George de La Hèle (1547-1586) and Jean-Noël Marchand (1666-1710), by Dmitri Bortnyansky (1777) and Jean-Philippe Rameau  (In convertendo Dominus, c. 1710), by 16th century Scottish priest Patrick Douglas, as a motet for choir and orchestra and by Jules Van Nuffel for mixed choir and organ as his Op. 32 (1926); it has also been set in part (alternate verses only) for a cappella choir by Giovanni Bernardino Nanino. (For settings of the text in other languages, see here).

Text 
The Latin text is given below alongside the translation of the psalm in the King James Bible.

References

External links 
Score of In convertendo Dominus by  Giovanni Bernardino Nanino, ed. James Gibb, in ChoralWiki, accessed 1 January 2015.

Psalms